is the former vice chairman of Toyota Motor Corporation. Vice-Minister for International Affairs, Ministry of Economy, Trade and Industry in 1997 - 1998．Former president and CEO Katsuaki Watanabe replaced him as the new vice chairman of the company and Watanabe's spot being replaced by Akio Toyoda.

Other corporate position held by Nakagawa:

 Chairman of Tokio Marine Capital Co., Ltd
 Auditor of Shochiku Co., Ltd. 2001-2014
 Corporate Auditor of Aichi Steel Corp. 2006-
 President and Director of MX Mobiling Co., Ltd. 2008-?
 Director of Mikuni Corporation 2013-

References 

Japanese businesspeople
Toyota people
Place of birth missing
1942 births
2016 deaths